Jorge Polgar (born 14 September 1967 in Montevideo) is a Uruguayan economist.

Graduated at the University of the Republic, Polgar holds a PhD from Georgetown University.

Since 2016 he is the chairman of the state-owned Banco de la República Oriental del Uruguay.

References

1967 births
Living people
People from Montevideo
Uruguayan people of Hungarian descent
University of the Republic (Uruguay) alumni
Uruguayan economists
Georgetown University alumni
Academic staff of Universidad ORT Uruguay